Gilbert "Gil" Brewer (November 20, 1922 – January 9, 1983) was an American novel and short story author. He was born November 20, 1922, in Canandaigua, New York.

After leaving the army at the end of World War II, Brewer joined his family, who had settled in St. Petersburg, Florida. There he met Verlaine in 1947 and married her soon after. Brewer started by writing serious novels, but soon turned to pulp paperbacks after a sale to Gold Medal Books in 1950, and afterwards specialized in fast-paced crime novels with a dose of soft-core sexuality. At one point, he had five books on the stands simultaneously. His best-selling book was 13 French Street (1951), which sold over a million copies.

Unwilling to promote himself, his career took a turn for the worse after a mental breakdown, and a long decline into alcoholism. Brewer died on January 9, 1983.

Works
This list does not include most of the many stories where Brewer was published under pseudonyms such as Al Conroy, Dee Laye, Connie Everett, Eric Fitzgerald, Morgana Hill, Jack Holland, Marc Mixer, Bailey Morgan, Luke Morgann, Frank Sebastian, Alex Sexton, Anita Sultry, Viola Vixen, and more.

Novels
 Satan Is a Woman (Gold Medal – 1951)
 So Rich, So Dead (Gold Medal – 1951)
 13 French Street (Gold Medal – 1951)
 Flight to Darkness (Gold Medal – 1952)
 Hell's Our Destination (Gold Medal – 1953)
 A Killer Is Loose (Gold Medal – 1954)
 Some Must Die (Gold Medal – 1954)
 77 Rue Paradis (Gold Medal – 1954)
 The Squeeze (Ace Double – 1955)
 And the Girl Screamed (Crest – 1956)
 The Angry Dream (Mystery House – 1957)
 The Brat (Gold Medal – 1957)
 Little Tramp (Crest – 1957)
 The Bitch (Avon – 1958)
 The Red Scarf (Mystery House – 1958)
 Wild (Crest – 1958)
 The Vengeful Virgin (Crest – 1958)
The Girl from Hateville (Zenith – 1958)
 Wild to Possess (Monarch – 1959)
 Sugar (Avon – 1959)
 Nude on Thin Ice (Avon – 1960)
Angel (Avon – 1960)
 Backwoods Teaser (Gold Medal – 1960)
 The Three-Way Split (Gold Medal – 1960)
 Play it Hard (Monarch – 1960)
 Appointment in Hell (Monarch – 1961)
 A Taste for Sin (Berkley – 1961)
 Memory of Passion (Lancer – 1963)
 The Hungry One (Gold Medal – 1966)
 The Tease (Banner – 1967)
 Sin for Me (Banner – 1967)
—and three original TV tie-in novels—
 It Takes a Thief #1: The Devil in Davos (Ace – 1969)
 It Takes a Thief #2: Mediterranean Caper (Ace – 1969)
 It Takes a Thief #3: Appointment in Cairo (Ace – 1970)

Short story collections
 Redheads Die Quickly and Other Stories (University Press of Florida – October 7, 2012)

References

External links

1922 births
1983 deaths
People from Canandaigua, New York
20th-century American novelists
20th-century American male writers
American male novelists
American male short story writers
20th-century American short story writers
Novelists from New York (state)
United States Army personnel of World War II